Pseudothelphusa is a genus of crabs in the family Pseudothelphusidae, containing the following species:

Pseudothelphusa americana Saussure, 1857
Pseudothelphusa ayutlaensis Alvarez & Villalobos, 1997
Pseudothelphusa belliana Rathbun, 1898
Pseudothelphusa dilatata Rathbun, 1898
Pseudothelphusa doenitzi Bott, 1968
Pseudothelphusa galloi Alvarez & Villalobos, 1990
Pseudothelphusa granatensis Rodríguez & Smalley, 1969
Pseudothelphusa hoffmannae Alvarez & Villalobos, 1996
Pseudothelphusa jouyi Rathbun, 1893
Pseudothelphusa leiophrys Rodríguez & Smalley, 1969
Pseudothelphusa lophophallus Rodríguez & Smalley, 1969
Pseudothelphusa mexicana Alvarez-Noguera, 1987
Pseudothelphusa montana Rathbun, 1898
Pseudothelphusa nayaritae Alvarez & Villalobos, 1994
Pseudothelphusa parabelliana Alvarez, 1989
Pseudothelphusa peyotensis Rodríguez & Smalley, 1969
Pseudothelphusa punctarenas Hobbs, 1991
Pseudothelphusa rechingeri Pretzmann, 1965
Pseudothelphusa seiferti Hobbs, 1980
Pseudothelphusa sonorae Rodríguez & Smalley, 1969
Pseudothelphusa terrestris Rathbun, 1893

References

Pseudothelphusidae